Jorge Sanz Rodríguez (born April 1, 1993), commonly known as Jorge Sanz, is a Spanish professional basketball player. He is a 1.88 m (6 ft 2 in) tall point guard who plays for Liberbank Oviedo Baloncesto.

Career
Jorge Sanz joined the junior ranks of Real Madrid Baloncesto on January 9, 2007, eventually progressing through the Cadete B and A teams, and is currently a member of the Junior team playing in the Liga EBA.  He made his senior team debut on April 16, 2011, for a Liga ACB match at CAI Zaragoza in an 84–86 defeat.

References

External links
Profile on Realmadrid.com
Jorge Sanz at fiba.com

1993 births
Living people
Baloncesto Fuenlabrada players
Básquet Coruña players
CB Peñas Huesca players
Club Melilla Baloncesto players
Liga ACB players
Obradoiro CAB players
Oviedo CB players
Palencia Baloncesto players
Point guards
Real Madrid Baloncesto players
Spanish men's basketball players
Basketball players from Madrid